Kanika Alana Beckles (born 3 October 1991, in Saint Joseph) is a Trinidadian-born Grenadian sprinter who specializes in the 400 metres. She represented Grenada at the 2012 Summer Olympics but did not start.   She reached the semifinals of the 2014 Commonwealth Games, after missing large parts of the 2012 and 2013 seasons with a torn hamstring and ACL surgery.  At the 2016 Summer Olympics she represented Grenada but placed fifth in her heat with a time 52.41 Seconds (a season's best) and with an overall ranking of 32nd. She did not advance to the semifinals.

Competition record

References 

1991 births
Living people
Grenadian female sprinters
Texas A&M Aggies women's track and field athletes
Trinidad and Tobago emigrants to Grenada
Athletes (track and field) at the 2014 Commonwealth Games
Athletes (track and field) at the 2018 Commonwealth Games
Commonwealth Games competitors for Grenada
Athletes (track and field) at the 2011 Pan American Games
Athletes (track and field) at the 2015 Pan American Games
Athletes (track and field) at the 2019 Pan American Games
Pan American Games competitors for Grenada
Athletes (track and field) at the 2016 Summer Olympics
Olympic athletes of Grenada
Competitors at the 2018 Central American and Caribbean Games
Olympic female sprinters